Uwe Timm (5 February 1932 – 7 March 2014) was a German writer, anarchist, and anti-militarist. He was the co-editor of espero. He was born in Hamburg, Germany.

Timm died on 7 March 2014 in Barcelona, Spain. He was 82 years old.

References

Other websites

 Uwe Timm at the German National Library

1932 births
2014 deaths
German anarchists
Writers from Hamburg
German male writers